Cabrillo High School is a California Distinguished School that serves students of Vandenberg Village, the city of Lompoc, and Vandenberg Space Force Base in Santa Barbara County, on the California Central Coast.

History
The school was founded in 1965 by the Lompoc Unified School District. Built to serve the residents of Vandenberg Space Force Base, Vandenberg Village, and the northern Lompoc Valley, Cabrillo answered the sudden population boom during the late 1950s and 1960s, a result of the booming space program at Vandenberg. Named for the early Spanish explorer Juan Rodriguez Cabrillo, the school board of Lompoc chose the Conquistador to be the mascot of the new high school in the early 1960s, with the black and gold of the first Spanish Californian flags as the school colors. In 2001, Cabrillo opened up its Aquarium Room to the public. In 2007 the California Department of Education awarded Cabrillo as one of the winners for a California Distinguished School Award, as well as 171 other schools in California.

Administration
The first school year on campus was 1965–66, with Camillo Wilde as the principal. Wilde would leave during the second school year to assume the position of Lompoc Unified School District Superintendent, and he was succeeded by assistant principal Robert Bickford, who would serve until the late 1970s. Wilde would return for a second stint as principal in 1978. There have been seven principals since Wilde's retiring in the mid-1980s: Dr. Debra Bradley (1986–1993), Mr. John Lemon (1993–1999), Mr. Jeff Carlovsky (1999–2003), Dr. Fred Manzo (2003–2005), Ms. Betty McCallum (2005–2008), Mrs. Lore Desmond (2008–2014), Mr. Jeff Wagonseller (2014–2018), and Mr. Isidro Carrasco (2018–Present). The current vice principals are Sue Pettis, and Brian Grimnes.

Sports
Cabrillo High School has won 13 CIF SS championships in 8 sports, including boys' basketball (1979), boys' cross country (2004), boys' track & field (1983, 1985, 1986, 1990, 1991), boys' water polo (1976, 1996), girls' track & field (1986), softball (1976, 1985), wrestling (1988), and women's water polo (2007). Cabrillo High has seen much success in aquatics, with a combined 62 league titles in boys' swimming (17 titles), boys' water polo (28 titles), girls' swimming (9 titles), and girls' water polo (8 titles).

Notable alumni
George Porter (1985) held the National Record in the 300 Intermediate Hurdles for 22 years (still #3 all time).
Duane Solomon (2003) Olympic track athlete; placed 4th in the 800 meters at the 2012 Summer Olympics.
 Danny Duffy (2007) baseball pitcher and 2015 World Series champion for the Kansas City Royals.
 Vai Taua (2006) Nevada football coach
Gabe Lopez is a singer/songwriter/producer

References

External links
 GreatSchools Inc: Cabrillo High School 
 Cabrillo High School

Educational institutions established in 1965
High schools in Santa Barbara County, California
Public high schools in California
1965 establishments in California